Harmontown is an unincorporated community in Lafayette County, Mississippi. A post office operated under the name Harmonton from 1879 to 1914. In 1900, Harmontown had a population of 75.

The Lafayette County Fire Department and Lafayette County Sheriff's Office are responsible for fire and police service.

Notable people
 R.L. Burnside, blues singer, songwriter, and guitarist

References

Unincorporated communities in Lafayette County, Mississippi
Unincorporated communities in Mississippi